Southeast of Saline USD 306 is a public unified school district headquartered approximately 4 miles west of Gypsum, Kansas, United States.  The district includes the communities of Assaria, Bridgeport, Gypsum, Kipp, Mentor, and nearby rural areas.

Schools
The school district operates the following schools:
 Southeast of Saline Junior-Senior High School, west of Gypsum
 Southeast of Saline Elementary School, west of Gypsum

See also
 List of unified school districts in Kansas
 List of high schools in Kansas
 Kansas State Department of Education
 Kansas State High School Activities Association

References

External links
 

School districts in Kansas
Education in Saline County, Kansas